The Farmer-to-Farmer (F2F) Program is funded by the US Agency for International Development through the US Farm Bill to assist developing countries, middle-income countries, and emerging markets around the world to increase farm production and incomes. It promotes sustainable economic growth, food security and agricultural development worldwide. Volunteer technical assistance from US farmers, agribusinesses, cooperatives, and universities helps developing countries improve productivity, access new markets, build local capacity, combat climate change and conserve environmental and natural resources. Farmer-to-Farmer also aims to increase the American public's understanding of international development issues and programs and international understanding of the U.S. and U.S. development programs.

Volunteers work on a wide range of activities to provide assistance requested by host organizations such as: private farmers, cooperatives, community groups, credit institutions, extension services, input supply firms, agribusinesses, and others. This people-to-people exchange promotes international goodwill, understanding of US foreign assistance programs and private involvement in development activities.

History
The Farmer-to-Farmer Worldwide Program was initially authorized by Congress in the 1985 Farm Bill and funded through Title V of Public Law 480. The 2014 Farm Bill designated the F2F Program as the "John Ogonowski and Doug Bereuter Farmer-to-Farmer Program." John Ogonowski was the pilot of one of the planes that crashed into the World Trade Center on September 11, 2001; the project's name honors his extensive work with immigrant Southeast Asian farmers using his land in rural Massachusetts. Retired Congressman Doug Bereuter was the initial sponsor of the program.

The Farmer-to-Farmer Program celebrated its 35th anniversary in 2020. More than 19,000 volunteers have served since 1985, assisting over 135 million people worldwide.

Volunteers
Farmer-to-Farmer volunteers are American farmers and agriculture experts dedicated to improving our world. Farmer-to-Farmer volunteers donate their time and expertise to provide technical skills to farmers in the developing world. Volunteers often partake on short-term assignments focusing on specific tasks to yield high impact. Local F2F offices identify and work with hosts to design these demand-driven assignments, provide logistics and translation services as needed, and follow up on implementation of volunteer recommendations. Farmer-to-Farmer volunteers serve all across the globe, completing assignments involving technology transfer, business planning, organizational strengthening, marketing, and environmental conservation. To learn more about Farmer-to-Farmer volunteers and read their stories, click here. If you are interested in volunteering, click here.

Results
The F2F program has demonstrated significant impact through high-quality services from volunteers. Volunteers help individuals and organizations build local institutions and linkages to resolve local problems. In the last five-year program cycle (2013-2018) alone, volunteers assisted their host organizations to increase annual sales by over $442 million and raise annual incomes by $75 million. The program leveraged over $28 million worth of volunteer time contributions to development efforts and mobilized $40 million from assisted local host organizations. The F2F Program trained approximately 163,000 people during the last program cycle, and 41% of all individuals trained were women. Since program initiation, over 19,000 volunteer assignments have been completed in more than 115 countries.

Current program
USAID has awarded cooperative agreements to eight organizations for implementation of the core F2F volunteer programs for international agricultural development for 2018 – 2023. The program will extend services to 37 core countries, providing more than 3,000 volunteer technical assistance assignments averaging three weeks each. An additional Agricultural Volunteer Opportunity Project (AVOP) will fund volunteer activities with new implementing organizations and special activities. The eight program implementing organizations will work closely with overseas USAID Missions and local partner organizations, supporting a variety of development programs aimed at reducing poverty and stimulating sustainable and broad-based economic growth. The core program agreements allow USAID country programs to provide additional funding for agricultural development projects using F2F volunteers.

Core Implementers 
 ACDI/VOCA
Catholic Relief Services (CRS)
Cultivating New Frontiers in Agriculture (CNFA)
IESC
Land O’Lakes Venture37
NCBA CLUSA
Partners of the Americas
Winrock International
F2F emphasizes achieving economic impact and measurable results by concentrating volunteer assignments in specific geographic areas, commodities programs and service sectors. Programs go beyond simply placing volunteers on an individual basis and focus on developing specific market chains for which overall impact can be evaluated. Programs build institutions and transfer technology and management expertise to link smallholder farmers with markets that make use of comparative advantages in production, processing and marketing. Volunteers typically work with medium and small agro-enterprises, cooperatives, individual producers, agricultural extension and research agencies, and financial institutions.

Major areas of program focus are: horticulture, dairy and livestock, staple food crops, producer organization development, financial services, marketing and processing, agricultural education and training, and natural resources management.

Agricultural Volunteer Opportunity Project 
Farmer-to-Farmer includes an Agricultural Volunteer Opportunity Project (AVOP) to test innovative approaches for use of volunteers, draw from non-traditional volunteer sources, develop capacity of non-traditional volunteer organizations, and address niche agricultural sector problems. Special projects are implemented by voluntary technical assistance organizations as sub-awards. Each sub-award is a full F2F program in a specific country or thematic area that helps to develop the capacity of the implementing organization to carry out larger-scale volunteer programs. Program oversight, mentoring, training, and program visits provided ensure sub-grant implementers are successful. AVOP also supports F2F core implementing partners through knowledge management and capacity development activities. Partners of the Americas (POA) currently manages AVOP.

Countries with Projects Under Current F2F Cycle
ACDI VOCA
 Armenia – Food Safety; Rural Enterprise Development
 Georgia – Food Safety; Rural Enterprise Development
 Kyrgyzstan – Rural Enterprise Development; Agricultural Education and Training
 Tajikistan – Rural Enterprise Development
Catholic Relief Services
 Benin – Cashew, Soybeans
 Ethiopia – Livestock; Crops
 Nepal – Livestock; Crops
 Rwanda – Horticulture; Maize
 Timor-Leste – Modernizing Agriculture
 Uganda – Livestock; Agribusiness Development; Agricultural Education
CNFA
 Madagascar – Horticulture; Rice; Livestock; Aquaculture
 Malawi – Horticulture; Aquaculture; Legumes
 Moldova – Organic Agriculture; Livestock/Dairy
 Mozambique – Horticulture; Poultry; Service Sub-Sector
 Zambia – Horticulture; Legumes; Aquaculture
 Zimbabwe – Horticulture; Livestock/Dairy; Legumes
IESC 
 Kenya – Access to Finance
 Sri Lanka – Access to Finance
 Tanzania – Access to Finance
Land O'Lakes Venture37 
 Bangladesh – Food Safety & Quality
 Egypt – Food Safety & Quality
 Lebanon – Food Safety & Quality
NCBA CLUSA
 Ecuador – Coffee; Cacao
 Honduras – Coffee
 Peru – Coffee; Cacao
Partners of the Americas
 Colombia – Rural Enterprise Development
 Dominican Republic – Youth Development in Agriculture; Rural Adaptation and Resilience
 Guatemala – Rural Enterprise Development; Horticulture
 Guyana – Rural Enterprise Development; Horticulture
 Jamaica – Horticulture
 Myanmar – Agroforestry
Winrock International
 Ghana – Postharvest Strengthening
 Guinea – Agricultural Education & Training; Rural Livelihood Development
 Mali – Rural Livelihood Development
 Nigeria – Agricultural Education & Training
 Senegal – Agricultural Education & Training; Postharvest Strengthening
AVOP Sub-Awards
 Burkina Faso – Implemented by Browse and Grass Growers Cooperative: Livelihood Development
 Cambodia – Implemented by the University of Tennessee: Sustainable Intensification
 Morocco – Implemented by High Atlas Foundation: Sustainable Agriculture
 Philippines – Implemented by Grameen Foundation: Coconut
 Trinidad and Tobago – Implemented by Purdue University: Extension

Examples of Volunteer Assignments

Caribbean Basin 
 Haiti Coffee Production & Marketing: While working with host Makouti Agro Enterprise, veteran F2F volunteer Myriam Kaplan-Pasternak realized the potential for high-quality Haitian coffee in the international market. Kaplan-Pasternak recruited U.S. businessman and Haitian native Yves Gourdet to travel as an F2F volunteer to assess coffee production in specific regions of Haiti, educate producers on the U.S. coffee market, and determine the feasibility of connecting Haitian coffee producers to U.S. markets. Based on Gourdet's findings, he and Kaplan-Pasternak developed a business plan and launched HaitiCoffee.com, Inc. In the first year, Haiti Coffee imported 11,000 lbs of coffee, ending the year with a small profit, and was extended a line of credit from a private supporter. The next year, Haiti Coffee imported a full shipping container of coffee and expanded to a second production site. Coffee bean sales have now impacted the lives of nearly 3,000 farming families in Haiti, and the company has started reintroducing Haitian coffee to the world. In addition to linking producers to markets, F2F volunteers have worked to improve Haiti's coffee sector by training producers in sustainable production techniques and protecting plants against pests and diseases. F2F volunteer Jean Tsafack-Djiagu trained 97 coffee producers on using shade to increase yields and protect plants from the destructive coffee berry borer. Together, trainees established a Reflection Committee to lead production activities and declared, “We are ready to start a new life with coffee production.”

Asia 

 Bangladesh Dairy Feed: Land is scarce in this densely populated and disaster prone country and therefore, grazing land for livestock is shrinking day by day. Also, due to poor genetic potential of milking cows coupled with non-availability of balanced supplemental feed, the national average milk production in Bangladesh has remained very low (in the range of 1.5-3.0 liters per cow per day). In this backdrop, F2F volunteer Dr. Roy Chapin helped to develop the first dairy feed program in Bangladesh, which included developing a computer assisted program for formulating rations for lactating cows, a calf starter ration and a ration for growing heifers. “Making dairy feed is the intermediate step in having more milk, meat, money and manure produced in Bangladesh so people there will have more protein, energy, vitamins and minerals in their diets, more money in their pockets and more rice straw converted to fertilizers to increase soil fertility”, Dr. Chapin mentioned in his comments after the assignment. In practice, feed produced following Chapin's formulation is showing highly encouraging results with an average increase in milk production by around 40 percent, which means, the cow that earlier gave an average of five liters milk per day, now with Chapin formulated feed is giving seven liters. Feed production plant manager Mohammad Khasru and marketing officer Jadu Gopal in a recent interview mentioned that demand for their dairy feed is increasing and the marketing horizon is gradually being widened to cover most of the strategic dairy pockets in northern, eastern and north eastern parts of the country.

West Africa 

 Mali Sheep and Goat Farming: In the village of Solla-Bougouda, as in many other villages in the West Sikasso region, most families have corn porridge for breakfast; and corn porridge, break corn or corn paste with tomatoes, onion or okra sauce for dinner. If a third meal is taken the options are the same. New York City Chef Benedicto came to Bougouni Circle in the Sikasso region of Mali to share his creative use of farmer products in nutritious, inexpensive meals. He worked with 4 villages and 1 school including 125 men, 129 women, 118 youth and totaling 372 (36 with disabilities). He first requested that the participants share their cooking methods and ingredients. He then explored what was available in their community gardens and sold on the roadways. With this information he was able to increase the nutrition and diversity of their meals. Measuring tools were ignored. Participants were encouraged to use their intuition and trust their eyes and taste when creating meals. Almost half of children in the rural areas of the Sikasso region, 42%, show delayed growth (Malian Demographic and Health survey: EDSM-V 2012-2013). Benedicto built the capacity of men, women, and youth to prepare and appreciate more diverse food choices, such as the highly nutritious moringa tree leaf, papaya, sweet potatoes, and spices, along with the addition of protein from fresh milk, eggs, chicken, and fish from the local river. The village chief, Mr. Djeka Mariko, praised the results: “Benedicto you are a blessing…, by coming so far and training all of us on the importance of using our foods as our medicine to maintain health.”

Europe, Caucasus & Central Asia 
 Tajikistan Orchard Management: Akmal Dekhan Farm sits on 21 hectares in Sughd province, producing sweet apricot varieties that are in high demand in local markets. It is located in Tajikistan's portion of the Fergana Valley, a large triangular and very fertile valley in what is an often dry part of Central Asia. Sughd province is the country's breadbasket, with the most productive farmland in a country with only six percent arable land. However, agricultural practices remain antiquated, leaving productivity well below its full potential. F2F staff analyzed Akmal Dekhan Farm and determined that its major challenge was low productivity as a result of outdated orchard management techniques, which kept sales and income for the farm low. F2F volunteer Brian Flanagan, an international agriculture and rural development specialist from New York, visited Sughd province for two weeks to train a group of orchard farmers on proper pruning and grafting techniques. Mr. Flanagan also trained owners on the importance of soil testing and collected a number of soil samples from Akmal Farm, sharing the results and recommendations on proper fertilization once tests results returned. Finally, the volunteer demonstrated an inexpensive, non-toxic dormant oil spray that can be easily mixed using readily available ingredients and is highly effective at controlling many diseases and pests that afflict fruit trees. Mr. Flanagan's time with Akmal was well spent. Over the course of one growing season, gross sales increased 32 percent, while productivity jumped nearly 30 percent to 66,800 kilos. F2F assistance in orchard management and improved production practices has helped farmers satisfy local demand while increasing incomes and sustainability for their businesses.
For more information, please visit: http://farmer-to-farmer.org/

References

External links
 http://www.farmer-to-farmer.org
 USAID Farmer to Farmer Program
 ACDI/VOCA
 Catholic Relief Services
 CNFA
 Land O'Lakes International Development
 Partners of the Americas
 Volunteers for Economic Growth Alliance
 Winrock International

Government agencies of the United States